The 1995 NCAA Division I-AA football season, part of college football in the United States organized by the National Collegiate Athletic Association at the Division I-AA level, began in August 1995, and concluded with the 1995 NCAA Division I-AA Football Championship Game on December 16, 1995, at Marshall University Stadium in Huntington, West Virginia. The Montana Grizzlies won their first I-AA championship, defeating the Marshall Thundering Herd by a score of 22−20.

Conference changes and new programs
One team upgraded to Division I-A and two new programs upgraded from Division II.

Conference standings

Conference champions

Postseason
The site of the title game, Marshall University Stadium, had been determined in March 1994.

NCAA Division I-AA playoff bracket

* Denotes host institution

Source:

References